Mathias Point is a point about  north of Allen Point, Montagu Island, in the South Sandwich Islands. It was named by the UK Antarctic Place-Names Committee for W.A. Mathias, Royal Navy, a pilot in 's ship's flight during the survey of the South Sandwich Islands in 1964.

References

Headlands of South Georgia and the South Sandwich Islands